In Australia, each state has its own constitution.  Each state constitution preceded the federal Constitution of Australia as the constitutions of the then six self-governing colonies. Upon federation in 1901, the states ceded certain powers to the federal government under the federal constitution.

List of constitutions
The following is a list of the current constitutions of the six states of Australia. Each entry shows the ordinal number of the current constitution, the official name of the current constitution, and the date on which the current constitution took effect.

See also
 State constitution (United States)

References

State constitutions of Australia
Constitutions of country subdivisions
Law of Australia
Australian law-related lists